Anston Stones Wood is a 33.7 hectare (88.3 acre) biological site of Special Scientific Interest in South Yorkshire. The site was notified in 1955. The site contains the second best example of limestone woodland in South Yorkshire. It is also a Local Nature Reserve.

See also
List of Sites of Special Scientific Interest in South Yorkshire

References
 

Sites of Special Scientific Interest notified in 1955
Sites of Special Scientific Interest in South Yorkshire
Local Nature Reserves in South Yorkshire